NXDN stands for Next Generation Digital Narrowband, and is an open standard for public land mobile radio systems; that is, systems of two-way radios (transceivers) for bidirectional person-to-person voice communication.  It was developed jointly by Icom Incorporated and Kenwood Corporation  as an advanced digital system using FSK modulation that supports encrypted transmission and data as well as voice transmission.  Like other land mobile systems, NXDN systems use the VHF and UHF frequency bands. It is also used as a niche mode in amateur radio.

NXDN is implemented by Icom in their IDAS system  and by Kenwood as NEXEDGE; both Kenwood and Icom now offer dual-standard equipment which supports the European dPMR standard.

History
Icom and Kenwood began their collaboration in 2003. The NXDN protocol was announced in 2005, and NXDN-compatible products first appeared in 2006.

The NXDN Common Air Interface (CAI) was accepted at the Study Group 5 (SG5) meeting of the International Telecommunication Union Radiocommunications Sector (ITU-R) held in November 2016 and in report M.2014-3 published in February 2017 as an international digital land mobile system.

Applications
The NXDN protocol and the communications products in which it is used are intended for commercial Private Land Mobile Radio (PLMR)  and public safety communications systems. The technology satisfies the U.S. Federal Communications Commission (FCC) mandate requiring all communications systems covered by Part 90 regulations to use narrowband technology by January 1, 2013. Part 90 regulations specify a bandwidth of 12.5 kHz, but the FCC “strongly urges licensees to consider migrating directly to 6.25 kHz technology rather than first adopting 12.5 kHz technology and later migrating to 6.25 kHz technology.”  The FCC “will expeditiously establish a schedule for transition to 6.25 kHz narrowband technology.”

Technical characteristics
NXDN uses Frequency-Division Multiple Access (FDMA) technology in which different communication streams are separated by frequency and run concurrently. Time-Division Multiple Access (TDMA) systems combine the communications streams into a single stream in which information from the different streams is transmitted in interleaved time allocations or "slots." Code-Division Multiple Access (CDMA) systems allow many users to share a common spectrum allocation by using spread-spectrum techniques.

The basic NXDN channel is digital and can be either 12.5 kHz or 6.25 kHz wide.  6.25 kHz dual-channel systems can be configured to fit within a 12.5 kHz channel.  This effectively doubles the spectrum efficiency compared to an analog FM system occupying a 12.5 kHz channel.  The architecture of NXDN is such that two NXDN channels, within a 12.5 kHz channel for example, can be allocated as voice/voice, voice/data, or data/data.  As of 2012, this capability cannot be implemented in commercially available hardware on simplex or "talkaround" frequencies, but only through repeaters.

Systems that use NXDN also support mixed analog FM and digital NXDN equipment, including direct radio-to-radio communications.  This allows system owners to migrate to a narrowband, digital system without replacing the entire system at once. NXDN equipment is currently FCC type-accepted for use on VHF (137-174 MHz) and UHF (406-512 MHz) bands.

Data is transmitted using 4-level frequency-shift keying (FSK) modulation.  NXDN uses the AMBE+2 vocoder (codec) for digital audio.  This combination provides better weak-signal voice quality than for analog FM.  For an equivalent transmitter power, NXDN is represented as having a wider range and slightly better multi-path characteristics than analog FM in typical RF environments, specifically at the 12 dB SINAD threshold. The transmission bit rate is 4,800 bit/s.

The following FCC emission designators apply to NXDN transmissions:

8K30F1E 12.5 kHz single channel digital voice
8K30F1D 12.5 kHz single channel digital data
8K30F1W 12.5 kHz single channel digital voice and data
4K00F1E 6.25 kHz single channel digital voice
4K00F1D 6.25 kHz single channel digital data
4K00F1W 6.25 kHz single channel digital voice and data
4K00F2D 6.25 kHz single channel analog CW ID

Application functions
The NXDN protocol provides support for the following functions.  Implementation of the functions and the user-level interfaces by which they are accessed and used may vary by manufacturer.

Encryption:
DES Encryption: 64-bit block encryption cipher operating in OFB mode using a 56-bit key expressed in 64 bits with parity bits.
AES Encryption: 128-bit block encryption cipher operating in OFB mode using a 256-bit key.
Paging & status reporting: radio-to-radio and dispatch-to-radio
User aliases: 65,545 different group IDs and user IDs
Man-down and emergency call
Remote radio management functions: stun/kill/revive and monitor
Over-the-air programming
Over-the-air alias
Interface to third-party applications for: paging to radio, GPS location, taxi data terminals, in-building tracking

Audio quality
In all lossy compression schemes, trade-offs are made in voice reproduction quality in return for minimizing the raw bit rate of the transmission. This leads to artifacts and compromises of frequency response in reproduced speech. Encoders and other compression schemes that are highly optimized for speech are often unsuitable for non-speech audio, such as music or frequency-shift keyed data. Using an inappropriate encoder usually results in the creation of distortion and artifacts in the reproduced audio.

The audio reproduction quality of IDAS and NEXEDGE communications systems is dependent on the performance of the AMBE+2 voice codec used by NXDN. The AMBE family of vocoders has been subjected to comparative testing and found to be adequate for its intended uses, primarily mobile and aeronautical radio. The AMBE+2 vocoder has also been selected for use in the Motorola MOTOTRBO radio family as well as Hytera's DMR systems, and the Project 25 (P25) mobile radio system.  The following reports and papers are descriptions of laboratory-environment evaluations of AMBE+2 and other speech vocoders.

Compromises in audio quality are inherent in the use of any codebook-based speech coder, particularly when used in conditions of high background noise. Incremental improvements are being made in the algorithms, which may lead to differences in performance even while the basic method remains unchanged. In the US, the Department of Commerce Public Safety Communications Research laboratory regularly reports on progress in this field. While their work specifically pertains to Project 25 radios, it is directly applicable to any system using similar multi-band excitation coders.

NXDN Forum
The NXDN Forum was formed in order to promote the NXDN protocol in North and South America. The forum's members are:
CML Microcircuits
Freedom Communication Technology
Hytera Communications
Icom Incorporated
InterTalk Critical Information Systems
Kenwood Corporation
Ritron, Inc.
Trident Micro Systems which was bought by Motorola Solutions in December 2014.
Remota Tecnologia em Comunicação

See also
 Digital private mobile radio
 Digital mobile radio
 Terrestrial Trunked Radio

References

External links
Comparison of FDMA and TDMA Systems
NDXN Standard

Wireless
Mobile telecommunications standards
Telecommunications-related introductions in 2005